Hunan Agricultural University (commonly referred to as HAU or Nongda) is a public research university located in Changsha, Hunan, China.

Founded in 1951, the university was incorporated by two independent colleges under the name Hunan Agricultural College. Since Hunan was an agricultural powerhouse for the country, Mao Zedong, the founding father of the People's Republic of China, inscribed the school's name on its entrance sign. It changed to its current name in 1994.

The institution began with a focus on training students in various agricultural disciplines. After more than a half century's development, the school has evolved into a renowned comprehensive university. In 1978, HAU started to award master's degrees.  more than 50,000 students from 31 provinces across China study there, including 24,000 undergraduates, 26,000 continuing education students, 3000 graduate and doctoral students.

Organization and administration
The current president of the university is Fu Shaohui, who has served since 2014. The university has 7 vice presidents.

A semester system is used - i.e., the academic year is divided into two terms. The first (fall) semester lasts from September to January; the second (spring) semester from February to June. Each consists of 18 teaching weeks, finals are generally held in week 19.

Hunan Agricultural University is divided into 20 colleges:

Academics

HUNAU offers 69 bachelors, 101 masters and 52 doctorate degree programs. Also, it contains 7 postdoctoral research institutes, 1 national research center and 3 national engineering laboratories.

There are 1198 full-time faculty, including 3 fellows of Chinese Academy of Engineering, 226 doctoral advisors, 432 master advisors, 234 professors and 515 associate professors. Among them, 4 were awarded the title of National Outstanding Experts. The university also participates in Changjiang Scholars Program, 100 Talents Program and Recruitment Program of Global Experts.

Since the ninth five-year plan, HAU has been awarded 182 prizes, 13 of them were the national prizes, 169 were ministerial or provincial level prizes. In recent years, the university has undertaken over 145 research projects at national level and 918 projects at provincial level.

In 2007, the university had 16 enterprises of sole proprietorship or proprietorship. The total fund is 40 million RMB, and the annual income reaches 109 million RMB.

Rankings and reputation 
The Academic Ranking of World Universities, also known as ShanghaiRanking, placed HAU # 901-1000th globally. Hunan Agricultural University is ranked # 113 in China, # 293 in Asia and # 1060 th globally by the U.S. News & World Report Best Global University Ranking. The university ranked #1109 in the world and #161 in China by the Center for World University Rankings 2022/23. The university ranked # 971 in the world out of nearly 30,000 universities worldwide by the University Rankings by Academic Performance 2021–2022.

As of 2021, Hunan Agricultural University was ranked 679th by SCImago Institutions Rankings among research universities around the world. The 2022 CWTS Leiden Ranking ranked Hunan Agricultural University at # 1031 in the world based on their publications for the period 2017–2020.

Overall, Hunan Agricultural University was ranked among the top 1200 universities worldwide according to several major international universities rankings.

Research and Subject Rankings 
As of 2022, Hunan Agricultural University ranked the # 76-100 globally in the Academic Ranking of World Universities (ARWU) and 127th globally in the U.S. News & World Report Best Global University Ranking for "Agricultural Sciences".

Campus
The university is situated in the eastern suburbs of Changsha, with views of the city skyline. The Nongda area is comparable to a college town or even an edge city and many residents seldom go to downtown because of heavy traffic and overcrowding on bus route 317. However, with the opening of metro line 2, going to down and traveling through Changsha has become a breeze. The university has a single campus, bounded on the north by the busy thoroughfare - Renmin Road (East); on the south by Liuyang River; on the east by lakes and the west by farmland.

The campus has eleven numbered academic buildings and several administrative buildings. There are four large-scale residence areas: Fengze, Zhilan, Donghu, and Jin'an. Each area has about a dozen halls. The residence areas are coed but halls are single sex. Most of the rooms in Fengze, Donghu and Jin'an accommodate four people with basic facilities. Lights out time is at 11:00 p.m. in all areas for undergraduates. Some students, both undergrad and postgrad, have chosen to rent in apartment buildings adjacent to campus for better convenience and environment.

Notable people

Alumni
 Zachary Huang, 1977 - Associate Professor of Entomology, Michigan State University
 Howard Q. Zhang, 1977 - Professor of Food Science, Ohio State University
 Guo-Liang Wang, 1978 - Professor of Plant Pathology; Director of the Wang Laboratory, Ohio State University
 Jizhong Zhou, 1981 - Presidential Professor, University of Oklahoma; Research Scientist at Oak Ridge National Laboratory
 Ming-Shun Chen, 1981 - Professor of Entomology, Kansas State University; Research Scientist at USDA-ARS
 Longxi Yu, 1977 - Professor of Plant Pathology Washington State University; Research Geneticist, USDA-ARS
 Gan Lin, 1981 - former dean; Deputy Governor of Hunan Province
 Deng Xiaogang, 1985 - Deputy Party Secretary, Sichuan province
 Du Zhanyuan, 1978 - Deputy Minister of Education, China
 Jun Ping Zhang, 1981 - Senior Vice President at QuadraMed Corporation
 Zhigang Jiang, 1977 - Professor at Chinese Academy of Sciences; author of several books on biodiversity
 Xingyao Xiong, 1981 - Permanent Post Holder at Department of Agriculture and Agri-Food(Canada)
 Dongyou Liu, 1977 - Editor of “Handbook of Listeria monocytogenes” (2008), “Handbook of Nucleic Acid Purification” (2009), “Molecular Detection of Foodborne Pathogens” (2009), “Molecular Detection of Human Viral Pathogens” (2010), “Molecular Detection of Human Bacterial Pathogens” (2011), “Molecular Detection of Human Fungal Pathogens” (2011), “Molecular Detection of Human Parasitic Pathogens” (2012), “Manual of Security Sensitive Microbes and Toxins” (2014), "Molecular Detection of Animal Viral Pathogens (2016); "Laboratory Models for Foodborne Infections" (2017); "Handbook of Foodborne Diseases" (2018); "Handbook of Tumor Syndromes" (2020); "Molecular Food Microbiology" (2021); co-editor of “Molecular Medical Microbiology 2nd ed” (2014)
 Chen Run'er, born 1957, Governor of Henan Province
 He Jiatie, born 1961, discipline official
 Ma Yong, born 1957, politician, former party chief of Yiyang

Faculty
 Yuan Longping - father of hybrid rice
 Li Zongdao - father of ramie textile
 Liu Ziming - expert in grape science
 Li Fengsun - entomologist
 Gu Jidong - visiting professor, co-author of the textbook Environmental Microbiology
 Sun Songling - member of the editorial board, International Journal of Agriculture and Biological Engineering
 Sun Chuanxin - research scientist at Swedish University of Agricultural Sciences
 Mao Zhiyong - party secretary of Jiangxi Province
 Hu Dujing, plant physiologist

References

External links 

 Hunan Agricultural University (English)
 The Library of HUNAU (Chinese)

 
Educational institutions established in 1951
Universities and colleges in Hunan
Universities and colleges in Changsha
Agricultural universities and colleges in China
1951 establishments in China